Blame It On The Blues is an American jazz song composed by Charles L. Cooke in 1914. It was written as a piano rag. The song is not a blues song despite its title.

The song has been recorded by Ken Colyer, Sidney Bechet, Claude Luter, the Wilbur DeParis Band and the New Black Eagle Jazz Band, among others.

References

1914 songs
Rags
Jazz songs